Helophilus seelandicus, commonly known as the three-lined hoverfly, is a hoverfly endemic to New Zealand. The common name corresponds to the three black lines behind the insect's head.

Taxonomy 
This species was first described by Johann Friedrich Gmelin in 1790 and named Musca seelandica. The taxonomy of this species was most recently discussed by F. Christian Thompson in 2008.

Description 
The adult fly is approximately 15 mm in length.

Distribution 
This species is endemic to New Zealand.

Life cycle 
H. seelandicus maggots live in water with decaying vegetation, animals or dung.

Interaction with humans 
Despite being native to New Zealand, this species is commonly reported to the Ministry of Primary Industries Pest and Disease Hotline.

References

External links 

 Helophilus seelandicus discussed in RNZ Critter of the Week, 27 January 2023

Diptera of New Zealand
Eristalinae
Insects described in 1790
Taxa named by Johann Friedrich Gmelin